Ganoderma colossus is a Basidiomycete bracket-fungus species in the family Ganodermataceae, previously placed in the genus Tomophagus. Records are from central and southern America and equatorial Africa (see GBIF); no subspecies are listed in the Catalogue of Life.

References

External links

Ganodermataceae
Fungi described in 1851